The Grammis are music awards presented annually to musicians and songwriters in Sweden. The oldest Swedish music awards, they were instituted as a local equivalent of the Grammy Awards given in the United States. The awards ceremony is generally held each year in February in Stockholm. The awards were established in 1969 and awarded until 1972 when they were cancelled, then revived in 1987.

There are around 20 different award categories, which have changed over the years. Swedish artists and foreign artists who live in Sweden are eligible, as are artists in other countries if their music is produced in Sweden and targets a Swedish audience.

The awards are presented by IFPI Sverige, along with the newspaper Expressen.

History 

The first Grammis were presented on 25 September 1969 at Berns salonger in Stockholm. They were presented annually until 1972, after which they were discontinued. This was attributed the influence of music critics on the awards, especially after the win of unidentified group Philemon Arthur and the Dung at the 1972 ceremony. The Grammis were reinstated in 1987, fifteen years later.

During an acceptance speech at the 1993 ceremony, Popsicle guitarist Fredrik Norberg wished that the members of Arvingarna would die in a bus accident. This incident caused a scandal in Sweden and the band's next record was cancelled. Following the 2011 ceremony, the separate categories of Best Female Artist and Best Male Artist were abolished and one Best Artist award was instead awarded.

Following the 2019 ceremony, the award for Children's Music of the Year was cut, with the IFPI citing low submissions to the category and the challenge of having an adult jury decide on an award for children. The decision received criticism and was reinstated for the 2021 ceremony. The 2021 ceremony was postponed from its usual February date to June due to the COVID-19 pandemic in Sweden.

Ceremonies 
Since the 1988 ceremony, the Grammis have been held at the beginning of the year to recognize music from the preceding year. With the exception of the 1970 ceremony held in Lidingö, every ceremony has taken place at venues in Stockholm.

Categories awarded
As of the 2021 ceremony, there are 21 categories, not including special awards:

Special awards include:
Honorary Award of the Year
Special Award of the Year

Grammis were previously awarded in the following categories:

Trophy 

The trophy was redesigned in 2007 by Efva Attling and made by Orrefors. It weighs , made of glass with a platinum star, and was designed so that it could be lifted with one hand. Attling described her inspiration as "the Empire State Building meets the Hötorget buildings".

List of winners

Album of the Year 
Album of the Year has been awarded since 1993.

Artist of the Year 
Artist of the Year has been awarded since 1988 for a significant contribution such as an album, concert tour, or other musical achievement. For the 2008–2011 ceremonies, there were separate awards for Female Artist of the Year and Male Artist of the Year.

Children's Album of the Year 
An award for children's music has been presented since the start of the Grammis and has undergone numerous name changes over the years, the latest being Children's Album of the Year as of the 2002 ceremony. It was not presented at the 2020 ceremony.

Classical of the Year 
Awards for classical music have been presented since the inaugural ceremony (with a gap in the 1990s), then referring to "serious music" (seriös musik). Classical of the Year can be awarded to an ensemble or a soloist; it has previously been presented as two separate categories.

Dansband of the Year 
An award in the dansband category has been presented since the 1988 ceremony, then called Dance of the Year. It has been renamed several times, sometimes including Schlager in its name, and is now called Dansband of the Year, as of the 2010 ceremony.

Electro/Dance of the Year 
An award for electro and dance music was first presented at the 1993 ceremony, then called Modern Dance. It was later known as Club/Dance of the Year and as Electro/Dance of the Year as of the 2001 ceremony. For several years, the category was merged with the one for hip hop and soul. To be eligible, nominees must have released at least two singles or an album.

Group of the Year 
Group of the Year was first awarded at the 1969 ceremony, and subsequently during several other years.

Hard Rock/Metal of the Year 
An award for hard rock music has been presented since the 1993 ceremony; heavy metal music was included in the category starting with the 2012 ceremony.

Jazz of the Year 
An award for a jazz album has been presented since the first ceremony in 1969. For the 2000–2002 ceremonies, the category also included blues.

Lyricist of the Year 
Lyricist of the Year was first awarded at the 1969 ceremony, and then annually since the 1989 ceremony. The award can be presented to an individual or a songwriting team, usually in connection to an album.

Music Video of the Year 
Music Video of the Year has been awarded since 1990 to the director of a music video that accompanies one song. The director must be a Swedish citizen or permanent resident. Voting for the category is done in two steps: first by a large jury, then by a specialized jury. In several years during the 2000s, the category was presented with MTV Sweden.

Newcomer of the Year 
Newcomer of the Year has been awarded since 1988 to an artist at the beginning of their musical career. Nominees must have released at least two songs or a debut album and must not have previously submitted for nomination. A group can be eligible if fewer than 50% of its members have previously released albums. The category was previously presented as Debut Popular Production of the Year in 1970 and 1971.

Producer of the Year 
Producer of the Year was first awarded at the 1969 ceremony and next awarded in 1988 as Best Producer; it has since been awarded annually.

Rock of the Year 
Awards for rock music on their own have been presented since the 1990 ceremony. Prior to this, awards in combined Pop/Rock categories have been presented, a practice which sometimes continued into the 1990s and 2000s. It was previously separated into group and solo artist (male and female) categories, but has been one gender-neutral award since 2012.

Song of the Year 
Song of the Year has been awarded since 1990. Previously decided by the public, it is now chosen by a jury from the ten most popular songs of the year, based on sales, airplay, and streaming.

Songwriter of the Year 
Songwriter of the Year was first awarded at the 1969 ceremony, and then annually since the 1989 ceremony. The award can be presented to an individual or a songwriting team.

References

External links
Grammis 
IFPI: Grammis 

1969 establishments in Sweden
Awards established in 1969
Events in Stockholm
February events
Recurring events established in 1969
Swedish music awards